The Chaldean Catholic Archeparchy of Ahvaz (or Ahwaz)(informally called Ahvaz of the Chaldeans) is a non-Metropolitan archeparchy (Eastern Catholic archdiocese) of the particular Chaldean Catholic Church sui iuris (Syro-Oriental Rite in Syriac language) in Ahvaz, Khuzestan Province, southwest Iran.

It is directly dependent on the Chaldean Catholic Patriarch of Babylon, not part of any ecclesiastical province.

Its cathedral archiepiscopal see is Surp Mesrob Church, in Ahvaz.

History 
It was established on 3 January 1966, on territory split off from the Metropolitan Archeparchy of Sehna (now Teheran).

Episcopal ordinaries
(all Chaldean Rite)
 Thomas Michel Bidawid (1966.01.06 – 1970.08.24), later Titular Archbishop of Nisibis of the Chaldeans (1970.08.24 – death 1971.03.29) & Auxiliary Bishop of Baghdad of the Chaldeans (Iraq) (1970.08.24 – 1971.03.29)
 Samuel Chauriz, O.S.H. (1972.01.18 – 1974.05.01), later Metropolitan Archbishop of Urmyā of the Chaldeans (Iran) (1974.05.01 – death 1981.06.14) and Eparch of Salmas of the Chaldeans (Iran) (1974.05.01 – 1981.06.14)
 Hanna Zora (1974.05.01 – 2011.06.10), later first Archbishop-Bishop of newly established Mar Addai of Toronto of the Chaldeans (Canada) (2011.06.10 – retired 2014.05.03)
Patriarchal Administrator Ramzi Garmou (2013? – ...), while Apostolic Visitor in Europe of the Chaldeans (2013.07.20 – ...), President of Iranian Episcopal Conference (2015 – ...); previously Coadjutor Archeparchof Tehran of the Chaldeans (Iran) (1995.05.05 – 1999.02.07), succeeded as Metropolitan Archbishop of Tehran of the Chaldeans (1999.02.07 – ...), also President of Iranian Episcopal Conference (2007 – 2011.11)

See also 
Catholic Church in Iran
Chaldean Catholic Church

References

External links 
 GCatholic

Christian organizations established in 1966
Chaldean Catholic dioceses